Odontoschisma is a genus of liverworts belonging to the family Cephaloziaceae.

The genus has cosmopolitan distribution.

Species:
 Odontoschisma africanum (Pearson) Sim
 Odontoschisma atropurpureum Stephani

References

Cephaloziaceae
Jungermanniales genera